The Oman cricket team toured the United Arab Emirates to play the United Arab Emirates in November 2015. The tour consisted of a Twenty20 International (T20I) match and a tour match. The matches were in preparation for the 2016 Asia Cup Qualifier.

Squads

Tour match

Two-day: United Arab Emirates v Oman

T20I series

Only T20I

References

External links
 Series home at ESPNcricinfo

2015 in Emirati cricket
2015 in Omani cricket
International cricket competitions in 2015–16
2015-16
Oman 2015